The 2011 Linafoot season was the 50th season of Top League Linafoot in DR Congo. Defending champions are AS Vita from Kinshasa. Seventeen teams entered the competition. TP Mazembe won the championship.

Changes from 2010
A new format was introduced. In contrast to the previous season, the final round is made up of eight teams in one group. In 2010 eight teams were divided into two groups of four with the top two finishers advancing to yet another group stage. The winner of the group of 8 will be the champion.

Preliminary round
In the preliminary round 12 teams in three groups played a double round robin. The group winners advanced to the next round.

SuperLeague (final round)
In the final round the three teams from the preliminary round join the top four placed teams from last season and 2010 Cup winner DC Motema Pembe. The eight teams play a double round robin, that is each team plays 14 matches.

US Tshinkunku also qualified for the 2012 CAF Confederation Cup as the 2011 Coupe du Congo winner.

References

External links 
  Tournament results and news at radiookapi.net
 League at FIFA

Linafoot seasons
football
Congo
Congo